Wanniyala is a genus of cellar spiders native to Sri Lanka, first described by Huber & Benjamin in 2005. They have six eyes and four pair of legs and grow up to 2 mm in length. The abdomen is globular and males have a distinctive distal hinged sclerite on the procursus of genitalia. The name is derived from the Sri Lankans native to the island that the first spiders were found on- the Vedda people- and their surname Wanniyala-Aetto.

Species
, it contains nine species:
 Wanniyala agrabopath Huber & Benjamin, 2005 — Sri Lanka
 Wanniyala hakgala Huber & Benjamin, 2005 — Sri Lanka
 Wanniyala labugama Huber, 2019 — Sri Lanka
 Wanniyala mapalena Huber, 2019 — Sri Lanka
 Wanniyala mudita Huber, 2019 — Sri Lanka
 Wanniyala ohiya Huber, 2019 — Sri Lanka
 Wanniyala orientalis Huber, 2019 — Sri Lanka
 Wanniyala upekkha Huber, 2019 — Sri Lanka
 Wanniyala viharekele Huber, 2019 — Sri Lanka

References 

Pholcidae
Endemic fauna of Sri Lanka
Spiders of Asia
Araneomorphae genera